Turku and Pori Province was a province of independent Finland from 1917 to 1997. The province was however founded as a county in 1634 when today's Finland was an integrated part of Sweden. It is named after the cities of Turku and Pori.

Åland was split into a separate province in 1918. In 1997 Turku and Pori Province was merged with the northern part of the Häme Province, the provinces of Vaasa and Central Finland into the new Western Finland Province.

Maps

Municipalities in 1997 (cities in bold) 

Alastaro
Askainen
Aura
Dragsfjärd
Eura
Eurajoki
Halikko
Harjavalta
Honkajoki
Houtskär
Huittinen
Iniö
Jämijärvi
Kaarina
Kankaanpää
Karinainen
Karvia
Kimito
Kiikala
Kiikoinen
Kisko
Kiukainen
Kodisjoki
Kokemäki
Korpo
Koski Tl
Kullaa
Kustavi
Kuusjoki
Köyliö
Laitila
Lappi
Lavia
Lemu
Lieto
Loimaa
Loimaan kunta
Luvia
Marttila
Masku
Mellilä
Merikarvia
Merimasku
Mietoinen
Muurla
Mynämäki
Naantali
Nakkila
Nagu
Noormarkku
Nousiainen
Oripää
Pargas
Paimio
Perniö
Pertteli
Piikkiö
Pomarkku
Pori
Punkalaidun
Pyhäranta
Pöytyä
Raisio
Rauma
Rusko
Rymättylä
Salo
Sauvo
Siikainen
Somero
Suodenniemi
Suomusjärvi
Säkylä
Särkisalo
Taivassalo
Tarvasjoki
Turku
Ulvila
Uusikaupunki
Vahto
Vammala
Vampula
Vehmaa
Velkua
Västanfjärd
Yläne
Äetsä

Former municipalities (disestablished before 1997) 

 Ahlainen
 Angelniemi
 Hinnerjoki
 Hitis
 Honkilahti
 Kakskerta
 Kalanti
 Karjala
 Karkku
 Karuna
 Kauvatsa
 Keikyä
 Kiikka
 Kuusisto
 Lokalahti
 Maaria
 Metsämaa
 Naantalin mlk
 Paattinen
 Paraisten mlk
 Porin mlk
 Pyhämaa
 Rauman mlk
 Suoniemi
 Tyrvää
 Uskela
 Uudenkaupungin mlk

Governors
Bror Rålamb 1634–1637  
Melkior von Falkenberg 1637–1641  
Melkior von Falkenberg 1641–1642 (County of Åbo)  
Knut Lillienhöök 1642–1646 (County of Åbo)   
No governor 1641–1646 (County of Björneborg)   
Knut Lillienhöök 1647–1648  
Lorentz Creutz (elder) 1649–1655
Erik von der Linde 1655–1666
Ernst Johan Creutz (elder) 1666
Harald Oxe 1666–1682
Lorenz Creutz (younger) 1682–1698
Jakob Bure 1698–1706
Justus von Palmberg 1706–1714
Johan Stiernstedt 1711–1713 (acting) and 1714–1722
Otto Reinhold Yxkull 1722–1746
Lars Johan Ehrenmalm 1744–1747 (acting) and 1747–1749
Johan Georg Lillienberg 1749–1757
Jeremias Wallén 1757–1768
Kristoffer Johan Rappe 1769–1776
Fredrik Ulrik von Rosen 1776–1781
Nils Fredenskiöld 1780 (acting)
Magnus Wilhelm Armfelt 1782–1790
Joakim von Glan 1790–1791 (acting)
Ernst Gustaf von Willebrand 1790–1806
Olof Wibelius 1801–1802 (acting)
Knut von Troil 1806–1816
Otto Herman Lode 1811–1813 (acting)
Carl Erik Mannerheim 1816–1826
Lars Gabriel von Haartman 1820–1822 (acting)
Eric Wallenius 1822–1826 (acting) and 1826–1828
Adolf Broberg 1828–1831
Lars Gabriel von Haartman 1831–1842
Gabriel Anton Cronstedt 1840–1842 (acting) and 1842–1856
Samuel Werner von Troil 1856 (acting)
Carl Fabian Langenskiöld 1856–1858
Selim Mohamed Ekbom 1857–1858 (acting)
Johan Axel Cedercreutz 1858–1863 (acting) and 1863
Carl Magnus Creutz 1864–1866 (acting) and 1866–1889
Axel Gustaf Samuel von Troil 1889–1891
Wilhelm Theodor von Kraemer 1891–1903
Theodor Hjalmar Lang 1903–1905
Knut Gustaf Nikolai Borgenström 1905–1911
Eliel Ilmari Wuorinen 1911–1917
Albert Alexander von Hellens 1917 (acting)
Kaarlo Collan 1917–1922
Ilmari Helenius 1922–1932
Wilho Kyttä 1932–1949
Erkki Härmä 1949–1957
Esko Kulovaara 1957–1971
Sylvi Siltanen 1972–1977
Paavo Aitio 1977–1985
Pirkko Työläjärvi 1985–1997

Provinces of Finland (1917–97)
1634 establishments in Sweden